Matteo Franchetti (born 3 May 1996) is an Italian football player. He plays for ASD Godigese.

Club career
He made his Serie C debut for Forlì on 27 August 2016 in a game against Venezia.

On 8 September 2019, he joined amateur team ACD CastelbaldoMasi. He left the club on 5 December 2019 to join US Arcella. In the 2020-21 season, Franchetti played for US Levico Terme, while he joined ASD Godigese in July 2021.

References

External links
 

1996 births
Sportspeople from Padua
Living people
Italian footballers
Association football defenders
Genoa C.F.C. players
Forlì F.C. players
S.S. Arezzo players
Serie C players
Serie D players
Footballers from Veneto